Rud-e Hasan-e Sofla (also Romanized as Rūd-e Ḩasan-e Soflá and Rūd Ḩasan-e Soflá; also known as Kaleh Mar Sofla, Kalleh Mār, Kalleh Mār-e Pā’īn, and Kalleh Mār-e Soflá) is a village in Shaban Rural District, in the Central District of Nahavand County, Hamadan Province, Iran. At the 2006 census, its population was 73, in 20 families.

References 

Populated places in Nahavand County